An endangered language is a language that it is at risk of falling out of use, generally because it has few surviving speakers. If it loses all of its native people, it becomes an extinct language. UNESCO defines four levels of language endangerment between "safe" (not endangered) and "extinct":
 Vulnerable
 Definitely endangered
 Severely endangered
 Critically endangered

Africa is the world's second-largest and second most-populous continent. At about 30.2 million km2 (11.7 million sq mi) including adjacent islands, it covers 6% of the Earth's total surface area and 20.4% of the total land area. With about 922 million people (as of 2005) in 61 territories, it accounts for about 16.1% of the world's human population. The continent is surrounded by the Mediterranean Sea to the north, the Suez Canal and the Red Sea to the northeast, the Indian Ocean to the southeast, and the Atlantic Ocean to the west. There are 64 countries, including Madagascar and all the island groups.

Algeria

Angola

Benin

Botswana

Burkina Faso

Cameroon

Central African Republic

Chad

Democratic Republic of the Congo

Egypt

Equatorial Guinea

Eritrea

Ethiopia

Gabon

Ghana

Guinea

Guinea-Bissau

Kenya

Lesotho

Libya

Mali

Mauritania

Morocco

Namibia

Niger

Nigeria

Senegal

Sierra Leone

South Africa

Sudan

Tanzania

Tunisia

Uganda

Western Sahara

See also
Languages of Africa
List of extinct languages of Africa
Lists of endangered languages
List of Bantu languages
Guthrie classification of Bantu languages

Notes

References
 Ladefoged, P. (1992). Another view of endangered languages. Language, 68(4), 809–811.
 Adegbija, E. (2001). Saving threatened languages in Africa: A case study of Oko. Multilingual Matters, 284–308.
 Fishman, J. A. (Ed.). (2001). Can threatened languages be saved?: Reversing language shift, revisited: A 21st century perspective (Vol. 116). Multilingual Matters.
 Mous, M. (2003). Loss of linguistic diversity in Africa. AMSTERDAM STUDIES IN THE THEORY AND HISTORY OF LINGUISTIC SCIENCE SERIES 4, 157–170.
 Omoniyi, T. (2003). Local policies and global forces: Multiliteracy and Africa's indigenous languages. Language policy, 2(2), 133.
 Blench, R. (2007). Endangered languages in West Africa. Language diversity endangered, 181, 140.
 Sands, B. (2009). Africa's linguistic diversity. Language and Linguistics Compass, 3(2), 559–580.
 Brenzinger, M. (Ed.). (2012). Language death: Factual and theoretical explorations with special reference to East Africa(Vol. 64). Walter de Gruyter.
 Wamalwa, E. W., & Stephen, O. (2013). Language endangerment and language maintenance: Can endangered indigenous languages of Kenya be electronically preserved?.
 Sands, B. (2017). The challenge of documenting Africa's least known languages. Africa’s endangered languages: Documentary and theoretical approaches, 11–38.

Africa
 
Endangered languages